The 2020–21 Auburn Tigers women's basketball team represented Auburn University during the 2020–21 NCAA Division I women's basketball season. The Tigers, led by ninth-year head coach Terri Williams-Flournoy, played their home games at Auburn Arena and competed as members of the Southeastern Conference (SEC). They finished the season 5–19 (0–15 SEC) with a loss to Florida in the first round of the SEC tournament. On March 4, 2021, following a winless SEC season, Williams-Flournoy was fired as head coach.

Preseason

SEC media poll
The SEC media poll was released on November 17, 2020 with the Tigers selected to finish in last place in the SEC.

Preseason All-SEC teams
The Tigers had one player selected to the preseason all-SEC teams.

First team

Unique Thompson

Schedule

|-
!colspan=9 style=| Non-conference regular season

|-
!colspan=9 style=| SEC regular season

|-
!colspan=9 style=| SEC Tournament

References

Auburn Tigers women's basketball seasons
Auburn
Auburn Tigers
Auburn Tigers